John Abkemeyer House is a historic home located at Washington, Franklin County, Missouri. It was built about 1914, and is a -story, three bay hall and parlor plan, brick dwelling on a stone foundation.  It has a side gable roof, segmental-arched door and window openings, and open hip roofed front porch.

It was listed on the National Register of Historic Places in 2000.

References

Houses on the National Register of Historic Places in Missouri
Houses completed in 1914
Buildings and structures in Franklin County, Missouri
National Register of Historic Places in Franklin County, Missouri
1914 establishments in Missouri